The 1930 season was Wisła Krakóws 22nd year as a club.

Friendlies

Ekstraklasa

Squad, appearances and goals

|-
|}

Goalscorers

External links
1930 Wisła Kraków season at historiawisly.pl

Wisła Kraków seasons
Association football clubs 1930 season
Wisla